The Oregon Department of Transportation (ODOT) is a department of the state government of the U.S. state of Oregon responsible for systems of transportation. It was first established in 1969. It had been preceded by the Oregon State Highway Department which, along with the Oregon State Highway Commission, was created by an act of the Oregon Legislative Assembly in 1913. It works closely with the five-member Oregon Transportation Commission (the modern name of the Highway Commission) in managing the state's transportation systems.

The Oregon Transportation Commission, formerly the Oregon State Highway Commission, is a five-member governor-appointed government agency that manages the state highways and other transportation in the U.S. state of Oregon, in conjunction with the Oregon Department of Transportation.

Inception

The first State Highway Commission was created on August 12, 1913, and was composed of Governor Oswald West, Secretary of State Ben W. Olcott and Treasurer Thomas B. Kay. On January 12, 1915, James Withycombe became Governor and replaced Oswald West on the commission. The 1917 Oregon Legislative Assembly redesigned the State Highway Commission, with citizens appointed to replace the elected officials.

The new commissioners held their first meeting on March 6, and the commission was then known as the Oregon Highway Division. As Oregon's transportation needs started to grow, the division expanded and, in 1919, it employed their first State Bridge Engineer, Conde McCullough.

Events
This work was complete when the construction of the bridges over the Yaquina, Alsea, Siuslaw, and Umpqua rivers and Coos Bay were completed, closing the last gaps in the highway.

In 2018, the city government of Portland, Oregon and ODOT entered into an intergovernmental agreement in which the Portland city government takes over the cleanups of transient camps on ODOT right-of-way in select locations in Portland in exchange for payments from ODOT.

In 2019, ODOT installed boulders at five locations in Portland to deter transient camps around the freeways. The installations have received support from neighbors while criticized by homeless advocacy groups.

Exploding whale incident
On November 12, 1970, the department was tasked with disposing of a dead sperm whale that washed ashore on the beach near Florence. The department exploded the dead whale using half a ton of dynamite to blast it off the beach. Pieces of dead whale went everywhere including the beach, bystanders, a parking lot and a park, severely damaging at least one car. Willamette Week reports "The decision to publicly dynamite an enormous mammal has become one of Oregon's all-time most bizarre moments." 

This became known as the "exploding whale incident".

Directors

 John Fulton — July 1, 1969 – December 31, 1970
 George Baldwin — January 1, 1971 – June 30, 1971
 Sam Haley — July 1, 1971 – July 8, 1973
 George Baldwin — July 9, 1973 – April 30, 1976
 Bob Burco — May 1, 1976 – January 8, 1979
 Fred Klaboe — January 9, 1979 – December 31, 1981
 Fred Miller — January 1, 1982 – February 16, 1987
 Bob Bothman — February 17, 1987 – June 30, 1991
 Don Forbes — July 1, 1991 – 1995
 Grace Crunican — 1996 – 2001
 Bruce Warner — 2001 – 2005
 Matthew Garrett — December 19, 2005 – June 30, 2019
 Kris Strickler — September 2019 – Present

Slogans
 1913 - "Get Oregon Out of the Mud"
 1957 - "Building Oregon Thru Better Highways"
 1958 - "Oregon Freeways...Symbol of 2nd Century Progress"
 1961 - "Freeways are Easier"
 1967 - "Fifty Years of Building Better Highways in Oregon" (not technically correct; the department was formed in 1913)
 1978 - "Keep Oregon Green and in the Black"
 1986 - "ODOT on the Move"
 2006 - "The way to go!"

See also
 Glenn Jackson, an influential twenty-year member of the commission
 Oregon Department of Aviation
 State highways in Oregon

References

External links

Exploding whale video on YouTube, linked from Willamette Week news article
 Oregon Department of Transportation Museum online
 Oregon Transportation Commission

1913 establishments in Oregon
Motor vehicle registration agencies
Transportation, Oregon Department of
State departments of transportation of the United States
Transportation in Oregon